Edward Lincoln Abel (17 November 1860 – 5 December 1926) was an American politician. Between 1913 and 1915 he served as Lieutenant Governor of South Dakota.

Life
Edward Abel was born in Springfield, Illinois. He studied law and after his admission to the bar he practiced as an attorney. He settled in Bridgewater, South Dakota and continued his work as a lawyer. In addition he was engaged in agricultural pursuits such as farming and ranching and in the banking business. Politically he joined the Republican Party and became city attorney, alderman and mayor of Bridgewater. He was also President of the Board of Education. Between 1903 and 1906 he held a seat in the State Senate. Since 1907 he resided in Huron, South Dakota where he also occupied some local political offices. In 1907 he became president of the City National Bank.

In 1912 Edward Abel was elected to the office of the Lieutenant Governor of South Dakota. He served in this position between 1913 and 1915 when his term ended. In this function he was the deputy of Governor Frank M. Byrne and he presided over the State Senate. After the end of his term he did not hold any other political offices. He died on 5 December 1926 in Long Beach, California.

External links

 The Political Graveyard

1860 births
1926 deaths
Politicians from Springfield, Illinois
People from McCook County, South Dakota
Illinois lawyers
South Dakota lawyers
School board members in South Dakota
Lieutenant Governors of South Dakota
Republican Party South Dakota state senators
People from Huron, South Dakota
19th-century American lawyers